The  is an electric multiple unit (EMU) train type operated by Kintetsu Railway in Japan on limited express services on the Osaka and Nagoya Lines.

Variants 
 5200 series: 4-car sets which are designated as the first batch introduced in 1988.
 5209 series: 4-car sets with backup auxiliary power source switched to a static inverter introduced in 1991.
 5211 series: 4-car sets with modified bogies introduced in 1993.

Overview

Formations 
5200 series sets are formed as follows. 

The two 5209 series sets (5209–5210) are formed as follows.

The three 5211 series sets (5211–5213) are formed as follows.

Interior 
Seating consists of perpendicular seating throughout.

History 
The trains were introduced in 1988 to fulfill a need for long-distance services as well as for replacing aging 2600 series trainsets.

The design of the trains revolved around three principles:

 More comfortable
 Multi purpose (Vehicles suitable for morning and evening commuting, daytime long-distance express transportation, and for private charters)
 Modern technology (For ease of maintenance)

In 1988, the series won the Good Design Award by the Japan Institute of Design Promotion.

In September 2014, set 5205 was repainted in a commemorative livery from the 1960s.

References

External links 

 Kintetsu official website 

Electric multiple units of Japan
5200 series

Kinki Sharyo multiple units
1500 V DC multiple units of Japan